John Proudfoot may refer to:

 John Hugh Proudfoot (1912–1980), Canadian politician
 John Proudfoot (footballer) (1874–1934), Scottish footballer